Cardita brookesi is a bivalve mollusc of the family Carditidae, endemic to the north east coast of the North Island of New Zealand including Great Barrier Island and the Mercury Islands.

References
 Powell A. W. B., New Zealand Mollusca, William Collins Publishers Ltd, Auckland, New Zealand 1979 

Carditidae
Bivalves of New Zealand
Taxa named by Harold John Finlay